The Tucson mayoral election of 1995 occurred on November 7, 1995 to elect the mayor of Tucson, and occurred coinciding with the elections to the Tucson City Council wards 1, 2 and 4. It saw the reelection of incumbent mayor George Miller.

Nominations
Primaries were held for the Democratic, Libertarian, and Republican parties on September 7, 1999.

Democratic primary

Libertarian primary
Originally also running in the Libertarian primary was Elizabeth Strong-Anderson, who was removed from the ballot by court order.

Republican primary
Originally also running in the Libertarian primary was Elizabeth Strong-Anderson, who was removed from the ballot by court order.

General election

References

Mayoral elections in Tucson, Arizona
Tucson
Tucson